Kings in Grass Castles  is a 1959 book of history by Dame Mary Durack (1913–1994). The book is considered a classic of Australian literature.

It is the story of Durack's pioneering family establishing its pastoral interests in the Australian outback during the 19th century and concerns the life and times of Durack's grandfather Patrick Durack, an Irish immigrant who became a leader of the overlanders who brought their cattle on hoof to the tropical north. The book was notable for its portrayal of the role of women and families in the pastoral industry and collaboration and respect between the pastoralists and local Aboriginal peoples.

Durack published a sequel, Sons in the Saddle, in 1983. Kings in Grass Castles was made into a TV mini-series in 1998.

References

External links
 Kings in grass castles _ Mary Durack, National Library of Australia Trove
 

1990s Australian television miniseries
1998 Australian television series debuts
1998 Australian television series endings
1959 Australian novels
Western Australian literature